Allan Guy Hamilton (born August 20, 1946) is a Canadian former ice hockey defenceman, most notably with the Edmonton Oilers of the World Hockey Association.  He also played in the National Hockey League for the Oilers, as well as the New York Rangers and Buffalo Sabres.

Playing career
Signed by the New York Rangers of the National Hockey League (NHL) as a teenager, Hamilton spent his junior career with the Edmonton Oil Kings.  He met with great success in juniors, being one of the rare players to play in the Memorial Cup tournament three consecutive years.  His final season in 1966 with the Oil Kings saw the team win the Memorial Cup, led by Hamilton's remarkable 82 points in 55 regular season and playoff games, drawing frequent comparisons with his junior contemporary Bobby Orr of the Oshawa Generals. In fact in Hamilton's Memorial Cup-winning final junior year, Hamilton and Orr highlighted the championship game by trading end-to-end rushes.

Hamilton made a rather auspicious debut with the Rangers on a Wednesday night hockey broadcast. As Frank Mahovlich was skating down the boards, Hamilton entered the playing surface from the bench on a line change and knocked out the unsuspecting Mahovlich with a thundering shoulder check that required smelling salts to help him retain consciousness.. While he played a few games for the Rangers in 1966, he toiled for the next three seasons in the minors, winning all-star accolades for the Omaha Knights of the Central Hockey League in 1967 and spending the two years thereafter with the Buffalo Bisons of the American Hockey League. Hamilton finally cracked the Rangers' lineup in 1969, playing in 59 games, but he had arrived at a time when the Ranger defence was stacked and a new kid named Brad Park was turning heads. Hamilton was left unprotected for the 1970 NHL Expansion Draft and was selected by the Buffalo Sabres as their third choice.

However, when the World Hockey Association began in 1972, Hamilton jumped over to the fledgling league, signing with the Alberta Oilers for their first season.  Named the team's captain at the age of 26, he immediately responded with a 61-point season, his best as a pro,  A superb defender and leader, he captained the Oilers for four seasons and was chosen to represent Canada in the 1974 Summit Series against the Soviet Union.  Overcoming injuries that frequently struck—and which cost him most of the 1975 season—Hamilton remained the leader of the Oilers' defence corps for the whole of the WHA's history. When the Oilers joined the NHL for the 1979–80 NHL season, Hamilton had set the record for most games played (455) and most points scored (311) by any player while a WHA Oiler.

Retirement
Hamilton finished his career back in the NHL, playing 31 games with the Edmonton Oilers in 1979–80; however, beset by a lingering eye injury from the previous season, he retired at season's end.  His number "3" was the first retired by the franchise. As of 2021, Hamilton is the only Oiler not to be a member of the 1980s Stanley Cup teams to have his number retired.

For the WHA all-time, he is 13th in games played, 15th in assists, 40th in points and 38th in penalty minutes.  He was also the franchise leader for the WHA Oilers in games, assists and points, and second in penalty minutes.

Hamilton remains active with the Oiler alumni and community affairs in the Edmonton area.

Family
His son, Steve Hamilton (born 1973) is the current head coach with the Calgary Hitmen of the Western Hockey League.

Awards and achievements 
Memorial Cup Championship (1966)
CPHL Second All-Star Team (1967)
WHA Second All-Star Team (1974)
Member of Team Canada in the 1974 Summit Series
WHA First All-Star Team (1978)
"Honoured Member" of the Manitoba Hockey Hall of Fame
Inaugural member of the World Hockey Association Hall of Fame

Career statistics

Regular season and playoffs

International

References

External links

1946 births
Living people
Buffalo Sabres players
Canadian ice hockey defencemen
Canadian people of Scottish descent
Edmonton Oil Kings (WCHL) players
Edmonton Oilers (WHA) players
Edmonton Oilers players
Ice hockey people from Manitoba
National Hockey League players with retired numbers
Sportspeople from Flin Flon
St. Paul Rangers players
New York Rangers players